Blue lobster may refer to either:

 Procambarus alleni, a blue crayfish commonly called a blue lobster
 Cherax quadricarinatus, another blue crayfish, common in aquaria
 Homarus gammarus, the European or common lobster, which is blue while alive (but becomes red when cooked)
 A mutated form of the American Lobster

Animal common name disambiguation pages